Television ratings may refer to:

 An audience measurement technique
 Target rating point, a metric used in marketing and advertising
 By national organisations that compile audience measurement and television ratings
 AGB Nielsen Philippines – in the Philippines
 Broadcast Audience Research Council – in India
 Broadcasters' Audience Research Board – in the United Kingdom
 Nielsen TV ratings – in the United States
 Television ratings in Australia – in Australia
 Television content rating systems, systems for evaluating the content and reporting the suitability of television programs for children or adults
 Australian Classification Board – in Australia
 TV Parental Guidelines – in the United States

See also 
 Rating (disambiguation)